Thailand is a unitary state, which means the territories are separated into central co-dependencies, with the central government deciding everything for the provinces. The kingdom is separated into multiple levels including regions, provinces, and many more. Though, formally, Thailand is separated into three levels: provinces, districts, and sub-districts, there are also informal divisions such as parimonthon, and phak. Furthermore, there are administrative divisions of the same level with different names such as the first-level divisions of the province and the special administrative region.

The governance is separated into two branches, regular and municipal administration. The regular administration is governed by the central government directly, with the municipal administration being given more autonomy by the central government, though still heavenly restricted due to the over centralization of the Thai administrative system. This system arose during Rama V's reign where the governing system of the Kingdom of Siam was changing rapidly due to westernization.

Regular and Municipal Administrative Division

Provinces 

Changwat (Thai: จังหวัด) or provinces is the first level of administration, the highest level, of Thailand. Thailand is separated into 76 provinces, though commonly mistaken as 77 provinces due to Bangkok's former status as a province itself. This is the highest level of administrative division within the kingdom. Each of the provinces are lead by governor. The changwat is responsible for implementing state policy and enforcing laws.

List of Provinces 

 The total population of Thailand is 67,592,000 as of December 2022.
 The total land area of Thailand is 517,646 km2 in 2013.
 HS – Harmonized Commodity Description and Coding System.
 FIPS code is replaced on 31 December 2014 with ISO 3166.

Governance 
The provinces are governed by a governor appointed by the central government. Specifically, the Ministry of the Interior is a part of the Bangkok Government. The norm for naming the provinces is using the provincial capital as the name, which is why they are called namesake cities. A notable difference from history was during the post-Franco-Siamese War period when there was a DMZ around the border which falls on the Mekong river. During this time, there was a province called Nong Khai but the capital was in Ban Makkhaeng. A province is administered by a governor (ผู้ว่าราชการจังหวัด) who is appointed by the Minister of Interior. The provinces are named after their namesake cities, a cities which were the "capital" at the time of its founding. Also, in several provinces the administration has been moved into a new building outside the city.

History

Ayutthaya Kingdom 

Most provinces date back to the time of subservient city-states, chiefdoms, and even vassal kingdoms. The polity was called muangs, not to be confused with modern muangs which means cities, which had their own satellite muangs. Traditionally ruled by a local ruling family, these muangs had a high level of autonomy. The highest king of these muangs, phaya or khun luang, though the titles changes over history, ruled these muangs through a system of tributes. The king did not have much control over these muangs which lead to uprisings and rebellions. During the war, these muangs often switched sides which leads to the downfall of the Ayutthaya Kingdom.

The provinces were separated into two classes and four different levels.

Rattanakosin Kingdom 

During this era, nothing changed much at the beginning. But when the western colonial powers started to eye the region, The Siamese government took to reform their administrative division into a form that much resembles the modern structure. In 1882, much of the current political geography of Siam had changed drastically. Rama V, who had been ramping up the reformation of Siam, had devised a plan to divide Siam into several levels of administration. During this era, the province wasn't the highest level of division. This falls to the monthon and the vassal kingdoms. At the time, Siam was a minor power, controlling several minor kingdoms on their frontiers with the major colonial powers. By, 1892, much of the divisions had already been formed, though this is far from modern Thailand's divisional structure, and by 1900 most of the territory gained during the rule of Rama III were lost to France and Britain.

In 1908, a new division called boriwen was introduced, though later abolished due to its overlapping duties with other local governments, and the bureaucratic costs to maintain the divisions.

In 1932, there were major reforms all over the kingdom, monthon was abolished, provinces merged, and several other divisions dissolved into higher divisions to cut costs. The former provinces that were lost are merged into other provinces or ceded to western powers.

During the 20th century, a massive reform occurred gradually over the century, which saw the formation of several provinces through partitions. The newest province is Bueng Kan which split from Nong Khai on 23 March 2011.

Former Provinces of Thailand 

 these provinces were formed in different periods but lost during 19th and 20th century

Historical Populations

Amphoe (Districts) 

Amphoe(Thai: อำเภอ) or districts is the second level of administration. There are 878 amphoe throughout Thailand. They are led by a Nai Amphoe or district chief who is appointed by the central government. These districts vary vastly in size and population. Districts’ population varies such as Amphoe Muang Samut Prakan which has 500,000 citizens to Amphoe Ko Kut which has 2,000 citizens. Note that amphoe meaning is a special name for amphoe which hosts the capital of the province, in these amphoe, there may be a thesaban nakhon or a thesaban muang. Amphoe are responsible for general administrative work, clerical work and archives, information, briefings and public relations operations of the district, operations related to receptions, ceremonies, government ceremonies, religious ceremonies and various traditional events,operations of the Red Cross Social work and various charitable works.

History 
Amphoe originated from the RS115(1896) bill named Local Governing Regulations R.E. 115. At this time, the method for determining the area of an amphoe was to assign 10,000 citizens to a district.

There used to be an administrative division called king amphoe(กิ่งอำเภอ) or minor districts, these are set up when a district is too big and it becomes inconvenient to govern, though a subordinate of the amphoe, king amphoe act and govern as an amphoe. If a king amphoe becomes developed enough with the necessary infrastructure and population, it becomes promoted into a full amphoe. The opposite could also happen, if an amphoe loses influence it could be downgraded into a king amphoe. In 2007, to streamline the bureaucracy, the government relinquished the king amphoe and upgraded them all into amphoe, thus rendering the king amphoe obsolete. There were 81 king amphoe in 2007 at the time of abolishment.

Tambon (sub-districts) 

Tambon(Thai: ตำบล) or sub-districts is the third-level administration in Thailand. There are 7,255 tambon in Thailand. Tambon are responsible for the development of the sub-district in terms of economy, society and culture: organizing public services for the benefit of the people of their own locality.

History 
Tambon used to be second-level administration long before the establishment of the amphoe. Back then it was governed by the provincial capital which appointed a kamnan or phan as a leader of the tambon. In 1892, the reformation downgraded the tambon into the third-level administration.

Muban (villages) 

Muban(Thai: หมู่บ้าน) or Villages is the fourth-level administration in Thailand. There are 74,944 muban in Thailand. A muban is lead by a phuyaiban, which is elected by the villager. All elected phuyaiban must be approved by the central government. Once in office, they can serve for a 5-year term with no limit on reelection. In cities, chumchon is used, though these are non-official and has nothing to do with the central government.

Thesaban (municipalities) 

Thesaban(Thai: เทศบาล) or municipalities is the second level of administration. There are three levels of municipalities: thesaban nakhon, thesaban muang, and thesaban tambon. Thesaban nakhon(เทศบาลนคร) is the highest of these municipalities and there are 30 of them. To qualify for a thesaban nakhon, an area needs to have at least 50,000 citizens and the necessary infrastructure for a city. Thesaban muang(เทศบาลเมือง) needs to have at least 10,000 citizens. Thesaban tambon is the lowest administrative level for a municipality. They are known for being complicated geographically. It can extend over a few tampons or be contained within a tambon. In order to qualify as a thesaban tambon, there needs to be an income of 5 million baht, 5,000 citizens, and a density of 1,500 per square km. Originally thesaban were sanitation districts called sukhaphiban created to manage waste. Sukhaphiban used to co-exist with thesaban until it was abolished in 1999. Their responsibility are to maintain public order, provide and maintain land and waterways, maintain cleanliness of roads. or corridors and public places Including the disposal of solid waste and sewage, and prevent and suppress contagious diseases.

Special administrative division

SAR (special administrative region) 

There are two special administrative regions within the Kingdom of Thailand: Bangkok and Pattaya. The SAR is an autonomous region governed separately from the central government. The mayor of the SARs is elected directly by the citizen of their respective SARs. The SAR category is an exclusive administration category where the central government had to have a bill passed exclusively to make a city a SAR. Note that the degree of autonomy is different between these two SARs. Bangkok is recognized as its own polity while Pattaya is under the administration of Chonburi province. Bangkok has its own khaet-khwang system and Pattaya uses the tambon-muban system. This makes Pattaya closer to a thesaban nakhon than a SAR, still, it is classified as a SAR.

Currently, there are plans to make Chiang Mai and Mae Sot a SAR. Though the plans for Chiang Mai is controversial due to the extreme centralization of the government. Especially within the parliament, conservatives called it separatism. A recent bill passed in 2005 and withdrawn in 2007 proposed a new province, Nakhon Suvarnabhumi, and was planned to be structured as an SAR. As a result of a coup, the project was cancelled and withdrawn. The major opponent to this was Bangkok SAR.

Khet and Khwang (special districts and sub-districts) 
Only used in Bangkok, the khet-khwang system acts similarly to the amphoe-tambon system, with the Bangkok government (not to be confused with the central Thai government) appointing the governors of these districts. There are 50 khet and 180 khwang within Bangkok.

Catholic Dioceses 

These are ecclesiastical provinces created by the catholic church. It is made up of archdiocese and smaller dioceses. There are two archdioceses within Thailand: Bangkok and Thare-Nonseng.

Informal administrative division

Krungthepmahanakhon lae Parimonthon (Bangkok Metropolitan Region) 

Bangkok Metropolitan Region (Thai: กรุงเทพมหานครและปริมณฑล) refers to the surrounding provinces of Bangkok SAR. This division is used to refer to the whole Bangkok and its suburb. Since Bangkok has outgrown its own SAR borders, neighboring provinces’ city is being absorbed into the Bangkok metropolis, though retaining their respective local government. The polity is defined as Bangkok and the five surrounding provinces of Nakhon Pathom, Pathum Thani, Nonthaburi, Samut Prakan, and Samut Sakhon. This definition of Bangkok is commonly used in radio, news, and everyday life when people refer to Bangkok.

Phak (region) 

Phak (Thai: ภาค) refers to the grouping of multiple provinces with regard to history, culture, and geography. There are ten types of phak divisions: 6-regions, 5-4-regions, meteorological, tourism, economic, highway, landlines, postal, electoral, and scouts. In everyday life, one would expect to be using the 4-regions system due to its simplicity and wide understanding of this system.

The four regions system is composed of:

 North
 Isan
 Central
 South

The northern region closely resembles the former Kingdom of Lanna. This kingdom was split into five minor kingdoms in the 1800s and fully absorbed into Siam. Owing to their cultural differences, people from the central plains discriminate against the people of the frontiers regions of Siam. This ingrained the division between us and them within the Siamese psyche.

The Isan region resembles the old territory annexed from the Kingdom of Vientiane and Champassak. The southern region resembles the former territories of the Malay sultanates and the Kingdom of Nakhon Si Thammarat.

Populations

Unorganized Administrative Region 
During the reign of Rama III, there was a massive settlement effort, in which many city and town were created during this time. This caused a "great reshuffling" of the provinces' territory. This ended up leading to the creation of the unorganized region of Promthep. This region was the result of the breaking up of the Kingdom of Cambodia's northern region and annexing it as a part of Siam. Later, this region was partitioned and merged into the Kingdom of Champassak, Kingdom of Cambodia, Khukhan and Siemmarat.

Abolished administrative divisions

Monthon 

Monthon (Thai: มณฑล) were administrative subdivisions of Thailand at the beginning of the 20th century. The Thai word monthon is a translation of the word mandala (maṇḍala, literally "circle"). The monthon were created as a part of the Thesaphiban (เทศาภิบาล, literally "local government") bureaucratic administrative system, introduced by Prince Damrong Rajanubhab which, together with the monthon, established step-by-step today's present provinces (changwat), districts (amphoe), and communes (tambon) throughout Thailand. Each monthon was led by a royal commissioner called Thesaphiban (เทศาภิบาล), later renamed to Samuhathesaphiban (สมุหเทศาภิบาล). The system was officially adopted by the 1897 Local Administration Act.

In 1915 there were 19 monthons containing 72 provinces. Due to economic problems, several monthon were merged in 1925. Monthon Phetchabun had been dissolved in 1915. Only 14 monthon remained: Ayutthaya, Bangkok (Krung Thep), Chanthaburi, Nakhon Chaisi, Nakhon Ratchasima, Nakhon Sawan, Nakhon Si Thammarat, Pattani, Phayap, Phitsanulok, Phuket, Prachinburi, Ratchaburi, and Udon Thani. In 1932 another four were abolished: Chanthaburi, Nakhon Chaisi, Nakhon Sawan, and Pattani. Finally in 1933 the whole monthon system was abolished by the Provincial Administration Act 2476 B.E./A.D. 1933, part of the changes made after the coup d'état, which changed from an absolute to a constitutional monarchy.

 Monthon Lao Chiang is the same as Monthon Phayap, to ease understanding in this table but in all cases, they are the same.
 Monthon Lao Kao which became Monthon Isan, and Monthon Lao Phuan which became Monthon Udon.
 The use of the name is up to interpretation and use on case by case basis, but name changes occurs due to Rama V integration policy of minorities and achieving assimilation.
 Province merger not shown, only monthon partition and merger are

Boriwen 

Boriwen (Thai: บริเวณ) was created due to the size of the three largest monthon hence a subdivision of monthons. Several provinces were grouped together into one boriwen. In 1908 the boriwen were renamed to changwat, which became the name of provinces in 1916. The monthon with between three and five boriwen were Phayap, Udon Thani and Isan. Each boriwen was administered by a commissioner (khaluang boriwen, ข้าหลวงบริเวณ).

Sukhaphiban 

Sukhaphiban (Thai: สุขาภิบาล) were administrative divisions of Thailand. Sukhaphiban were the first sub-autonomous entities established in Thailand. A first such district was created in Bangkok by a royal decree of King Chulalongkorn in 1897. Tha Chalom District became the second such district, created in 1906 and responsible for parts of Mueang Samut Sakhon District, Samut Sakhon Province.

In 1907 the act on operations of sanitary districts codified the regulations, and with the Local Administration Act of 1914 two levels of sukhaphiban were introduced, the sukhaphiban mueang for towns and sukhaphiban tambon for rural areas.

The number of sanitary districts grew to 35 in 1935, when these however were converted into municipalities (thesaban). New sanitary district were again established starting in 1952 by prime minister Phibun Songkhram. With the Act to Upgrade Sanitary Districts to Thesaban of May 1999 they were again abolished, and all became thesaban tambon.

Muang Prathetsarat 
Vassal states (Thai: เมืองประเทศราช)  existed within Thailand for centuries since the founding of Sukhothai. Though not directly part of the country or even arguably an administrative division. Nontheless, these states deserve a mention which is due to the fact that they are an entity within a certain polity.

Describing past vassals of Thailand requires the understanding of the mandala system. The mandala system is a largely diffused and dispersed power structure. This means that a vassal is largely independent to the central state, with the both the vassal also retaining sub-servient city-state-vassals. To explain this power structure, imagine if the United States is the central state, and Washington DC is the central state with 50 surrounding vassal states giving tributes to the central state and having open borders within these polities. These state-vassals also have subservient counties with autonomy in their internal affairs with these counties having their own autonomous sub-divisions. Thus, creating a pyramid of subservient cities and polities. Understand that it's not the current political structure of the United States due to the fact that the individual states could not just declare independence, which these vassal could, and had more autonomy from the central state. If the vassal states were to declare independence, it would incur the wrath of the central state. In history this was seen even when the Kingdom of Vientiane, a vassal, rebelled and lost which then was dissolved and absorbed into the central state.

The relationships between Thailand and its vassal varies over the centuries. It could be as amicable and the relationship that of the Kingdom of Nakhon Si Thammarat. Compared with the less amicable, aforementioned, Kingdom of Vientiane, which started a rebellion in 1826 under King Anouvong (Xaiya Setthathirath V). The last vassal state to be subservient to Thailand was the Malay states, which was subsequently dissolved, ceded, and merged into provinces and British Malaya in 1909, and the Kingdom of Champassak, which was downgraded into a province.

*Twelve Cantons were actually composed of twelve to sixteen different cantons. Note that through out the centuries, different cantons held the same seats. The number of seats range from 12 to 16.

**Chiang Khaeng was merged with the Principality of Nan after the transfer.

Lost Territories 
There are various territories which was partitioned and transfered to another poltical entity over the centuries. This could be either that the central government gave an order, or an independent action acted upon by the individual muang prathetsarat.

Former administrative division maps

References 

 
T
Thailand geography-related lists
Thailand
Provinces, Thailand
Thailand, provinces by area
Thailand
Geography of Thailand
Thailand